Theriological School – a professional and educational network that unites specialists in mammalogy of Ukraine and adjacent countries, first of all Poland, Belarus and, from time to time, Estonia, Russia and Romania. Theriological school as a community exists both as a network of professionals and as an annual meeting.

History 

Theriological School was started as one of the sections of Ukrainian theriological society (UTS) of the National Academy of Sciences of Ukraine (NAS) in Autumn 1993 (24 November 1993) by a joint decision of three institutions – Ukrainian Theriological Society, Ministry of Nature Conservation and the Commission on the Reserves of NAS of Ukraine. Since its foundation in 1993 and until now Therioschool became one of the main activity of UTS. Igor Zagorodniuk, deputy head of the UTS, is one of the initiators of the creation and a head of Theriological school (together with O. Fedorchenko, O. Kiselyuk and V. Pokinchereda).

The first newsletter (later: a regular newsletter and since 2000 – a bulletin “Novitates Theriologicae”) was distributed on 24 November 1993. The first (and in future: annual) conference (a school-seminar) was organized on 3 October 1994 at Carpathian Biosphere Reserve. The first issue of a journal "Proceedings of the Theriological School" was published in 1998 and presented during the V Theriological school on biological station of National University of Kharkiv. A website of Ukrainian Theriological Society was started in spring 2003 (25 May 2003).

All activities of Theriological school are maintained entirely on the enthusiasm of its Board and its regular participants. The Board of the school organizes each next seminar in another place – usually, in one of the nature or biosphere reserves or at biological stations of one of the universities, and much less often in cities on the base of universities, institutes or museums of the natural history (the XII-th Terioschool was held in Luhansk, the XIII-th – at Kamianets-Podilskyi and the XXIV – in Odessa).

Objectives 

The concept of Theriological school was formulated in the journal "Nature Reserves in Ukraine" (1999) and these ideas were developed during all 24 schools. The key tasks of the society are:

 organization of regular meetings of zoologists working at nature reserves, national parks, biological stations and also at natural faculties of universities and academic institutions; exchanging of the experience in conducting of field studies of mammals;
 working out and unification of methodology in theriological investigations (a research of a species composition of local fauna; the estimation of a number of individuals and a development of modern intravital methods of investigations);
 the approbation of scientific results;
 the development of aсtivities important for nature protection and education. For example, the events called "The night of bats" and "The beast of the year", etc. are traditionally organized during each school-seminar (in 2017 Theriological society celebrated a year of the Hedgehog).
 The creation and maintenance of publications and other platforms to share the experience, including the forum "Theriological School" , the website "Therioschool" , the bulletin "Novitates Theriologicae" (8 issues) and a journal "Proceedings of the Theriological School" (15 volumes).

Forms and scheme of work 

Therioschool exists in two main forms – as a network of professionals and the annual seminar (workshop). The network includes more than 200 respondents from Ukraine, Belarus, Poland, Estonia, Moldova, Romania, Hungary (descending). The seminar is usually gathering about 30–70 participants and lasts on average 5 days.

The school follows a uniform scheme which is described in details at the website of society . The main features of Theriological school are:

 work of the school during one week (usually end of September – beginning of October);
 highlighting of one main topic of the year and work of the sessions in a framework of this selected topic at least for two days, including lectures and master-classes;
 every day of the school-seminar includes 1–2 round tables and master classes on traditional and relevant subjects (faunistic records, database maintenance, the assessment of populations status, GIS technologies, etc.);
 field classes and excursions which has the aim to visit the monitoring sites, accounting lines, etc.;
 information fairs, competitions "new names in theriology," actions "night of the bats," a beast of the year" and other activities.

Journal 

The Journal of the Theriological School – "Proceedings of the Theriological School" (later – PTS) is registered in International Center for Registration of Scientific Publications with ISSN 2312-2749 (print) and ISSN 2074-2274 (online). In 2018 journal changes its title to Theriologia Ukrainica.

The journal PTS was approved by Higher Attestation Commission of Ukraine (known as "VAK") in 2016 as a professional publication which can accept and publish the results of investigations in a framework of dissertation works. All articles submitted to PTS go through three reviews – primary review from the editorial board and two other reviews – from independent experts (peer review).

Since 1998, 15 volumes of the journal PTS were published (on average 170–180 pages in each volume). Also, each volume contains on average 18–22 articles.

The information about each volume is posted on Internet (the website of Theriological School) according to the requirements of the Web of Science: each volume and each article has its own homepage with a detailed English summary (over 1000 characters). Each article contains an abstract, key words, legends to the figures and tables, bibliography (everything is dubbed in English). Each volume has at least 4–7 articles written in English (this is from 1/4 to 1/3 part of the whole journal).

Page of the PTS in website of the National Museum of Natural History of Ukraine: >>>

On 20 October 2020, according to log profile on Google Scholar, there are 1623 citations of 308 articles of the PTS. h-index is = 16, the index i10 (the number of articles cited at least 10 times) is 40. These results are quite high for Ukrainian journals.

References

Research institutes in Ukraine
1993 establishments in Ukraine